Kovanen is a Finnish surname. Notable people with the surname include:

 Jalmari Kovanen (1877–1936), Finnish farmer and politician
 Tauno Kovanen (1917–1986), Finnish wrestler
 Tommi Kovanen (born 1975), Finnish ice hockey defenceman

Finnish-language surnames